is a Shinto shrine in the Ichinomiya neighborhood of the city of Tsuyama in Okayama Prefecture, Japan. It is the ichinomiya of former Mimasaka Province. The main festival of the shrine is held annually on April 29. Although the kanji of the shrine's name is now pronounced "Nakayama", in the past the shrine was often referred to by its alternative pronunciation "Chuzen Jinja" or "Chuzen Dai-Gongen".
Beppyo shrines

Enshrined kami
The kami enshrined at Nakayama Jinja are:
 , god of mirrors
 
 , goddess of mirrors and metal casting

History
The origins of Nakayama Jinja are uncertain. According to the shrine's undocumented legend, it was founded in 707 AD. There is another theory that the shrine was built when Mimasaka Province separated from Bizen Province in 703. The earliest  time the shrine appears in documentary evidence is in an entry dated 860 in the Nihon Sandai Jitsuroku. Per the Engishiki, which was complied between 905 and 967 AD, the shrine is listed as the only  in Mimasaka Province, and by the Kamakura period, it was regarded as the ichinomiya of the province. During the Sengoku period, in 1533, the shrine was burned down by Amago Haruhisa during his invasion of the province, and reconstructed by Haruhisa himself in 1559.

Cultural properties

National Important Cultural Properties
Honden, constructed in 1559 as a donation by Amago Haruhisa. It is a three by three bay hall in a unique shrine architecture commonly known as "Nakayama-zukuri" which is found only in this area of Japan.

Gallery

See also
Ichinomiya

References

External links

Okayama Jinjacho home page
Tsuyama City official homepage

Shinto shrines in Okayama Prefecture
Tsuyama
Ichinomiya
Important Cultural Properties of Japan
Mimasaka Province